The enzyme glycerophosphoinositol inositolphosphodiesterase (EC 3.1.4.43) is an enzyme that catalyzes the chemical reaction

1-(sn-glycero-3-phospho)-1D-myo-inositol + H2O  glycerol + 1D-myo-inositol 1-phosphate

This enzyme belongs to the family of hydrolases, specifically those acting on phosphoric diester bonds.  The systematic name is 1-(sn-glycero-3-phospho)-1D-myo-inositol inositolphosphohydrolase. Other names in common use include 1,2-cyclic-inositol-phosphate phosphodiesterase, D-myo-inositol 1:2-cyclic phosphate 2-phosphohydrolase, D-inositol 1,2-cyclic phosphate 2-phosphohydrolase, D-myo-inositol 1,2-cyclic phosphate 2-phosphohydrolase, 1-D-myo-inositol-1,2-cyclic-phosphate 2-inositolphosphohydrolase, and inositol-1,2-cyclic-phosphate 2-inositolphosphohydrolase.

This enzyme  1-D-myo-inositol-1,2-cyclic-phosphate 2-inositolphosphohydrolase, was reported to be identical to annexin III. Sekar and co-workers  clearly demonstrated the dissociation of 1-D-myo-inositol-1,2-cyclic-phosphate 2-inositolphosphohydrolase activity from annexin III. Perron and co-workers  confirmed on the basis of structural studies that annexin III did not possess an enzymatic activity. While the physiological significance of this enzymatic activity is still not clear, Sekar et al. [Biochem. Mol. Med. 61:95-100, 1007] reported over 10-fold increased release of this enzymatic activity in several patients admitted to the hospital's intensive care unit.

References

EC 3.1.4
Enzymes of unknown structure